Soghad (also Romanized as Şoghād; also known as Soqād and Sughāt) is a city in the Central District of Abadeh County, Fars Province, Iran.  At the 2006 census, its population was 11,065, in 3,001 families.

References

Populated places in Abadeh County

Cities in Fars Province